Shakeel-ur-Rehman (born 1 June 1982) is a Pakistani first-class cricketer who played for Abbottabad cricket team.

References

External links
 

1982 births
Living people
Pakistani cricketers
Abbottabad cricketers
Defence Housing Authority cricketers
Cricketers from Peshawar
Public Works Department cricketers
Peshawar cricketers
Peshawar Panthers cricketers
Sui Southern Gas Company cricketers